The 23rd Robert Awards ceremony was held in 2006 in Copenhagen, Denmark. Organized by the Danish Film Academy, the awards honoured the best in Danish and foreign film of 2005.

Honorees

Best Danish Film 
 Adam's Apples – Anders Thomas Jensen

Best Children's Film 
 Strings – Anders Rønnow Klarlund

Best Director 
 Per Fly – Manslaughter

Best Screenplay 
 Anders Thomas Jensen – Adam's Apples

Best Actor in a Leading Role 
 Troels Lyby – Accused

Best Actress in a Leading Role 
 Sofie Gråbøl – Accused

Best Actor in a Supporting Role 
 Thure Lindhardt – Nordkraft (film)

Best Actress in a Supporting Role 
 Charlotte Fich – Manslaughter

Best Cinematography 
 Manuel Claro – Allegro

Best Production Design 
 Jette Lehmann – Nordkraft (film)

Best Costume Design 
 Manon Rasmussen – Young Andersen

Best Makeup 
 Kamilla Bjerglind – Nordkraft (film)

Best Special Effects 
 Peter Hjort, Hummer Højmark & Lars K. Andersen – Adam's Apples

Best Sound Design 
 Hans Møller – Nordkraft (film)

Best Editing 
 Kasper Leick –

Best Score 
 Halfdan E. – Manslaughter

Best Song 
 The Raveonettes – "Please you" – Nordkraft (film)

Non-American Film 
 Downfall – Oliver Hirschbiegel

Best American Film 
 Sideways – Alexander Payne

Best Documentary Short 
 Kort film om tro – Nikolai Østergaard

Best Documentary Feature 
 Ondskabens anatomi – Ove Nyholm

Best Short Fiction/Animation 
 Lille Lise – Benjamin Holmsteen

See also 

 2006 Bodil Awards

References

External links 
  

2005 film awards
Robert Awards ceremonies
2006 in Copenhagen